Victor Frederick Vasicek (May 5, 1926June 20, 2003) was American football offensive and defensive lineman in the National Football League for the Los Angeles Rams.  He also played in the All-America Football Conference for the Buffalo Bills.  Vasicek played college football at the University of Texas and was drafted in the tenth round of the 1949 NFL Draft by the Washington Redskins.

1926 births
2003 deaths
People from El Campo, Texas
Players of American football from Texas
American football defensive linemen
American football offensive linemen
Texas Longhorns football players
Buffalo Bills (AAFC) players
Los Angeles Rams players